Germany was represented by Ireen Sheer, with the song "Feuer", at the 1978 Eurovision Song Contest, which took place on 22 April in Paris. "Feuer" was chosen as the German entry at the national final on 20 February, and was the second of Sheer's three Eurovision appearances; she had previously represented Luxembourg in 1974 and would later be a member of a six-piece ensemble in 1985, again on behalf of Luxembourg.

The 1978 German final is notable for the fact that voting was to be split in a 2:1 ratio between an "expert" jury and a panel of radio listeners but after hearing the songs, the expert jury decided that none was up to par and refused to vote, leaving the choice entirely in the hands of the radio panel.

Before Eurovision

National final
The final was held at the studios of broadcaster SWF in Baden-Baden, hosted by Detlef Werner and broadcast on radio only. 15 songs took part with the winner originally intended to be decided by a combination of expert jury and radio listeners. However, once all the songs had been performed the expert jury stated that if these were the best songs on offer, Germany would be well-advised to withdraw completely from the 1978 contest as all were substandard. As the jury refused to vote, SWF decided that the decision would therefore be made by the radio listeners alone. Each member of the radio panel scored each song between 1 and 10 and the song with the highest average score became the winner.

Other participants in the final included Germany's Eurovision 1974 representatives Cindy & Bert; Peter, Sue and Marc who would have twice represented Switzerland in Eurovision and would twice more; and Helena Vondráčková, Czechoslovakia's premier female vocalist who had won the Intervision Song Contest in 1977.

At Eurovision 
On the night of the final Sheer performed 13th in the running order, following Turkey and preceding Monaco. At the close of voting "Feuer" had received 84 points from 14 countries, placing Germany 6th of the 20 entries. The German jury awarded its 12 points to contest winners Israel.

Voting

References 

1978
Countries in the Eurovision Song Contest 1978
Eurovision